The 2005–06 Sta.Lucia Realtors season was the 13th season of the franchise in the Philippine Basketball Association (PBA).

Key dates
August 14: The 2005 PBA Draft took place in Sta. Lucia East Grand Mall, Cainta, Rizal.

Draft picks

Roster

Fiesta Conference

Game log

|- bgcolor="#edbebf"
| 1
| October 5
| Alaska
| 75-80
| 
| 
| 
| Araneta Coliseum
| 0–1
|- bgcolor="#bbffbb" 
| 2
| October 9
| Brgy.Ginebra
| 92-88
| Mendoza (25)
| 
| 
| Araneta Coliseum
| 1–1
|- bgcolor="#bbffbb" 
| 3
| October 15
| Coca Cola
| 89-79 
| Whitehead (35)
| 
| 
| Lanao del Norte
| 2–1
|- bgcolor="#edbebf" 
| 4
| October 19
| Talk 'N Text
| 80-87
| 
| 
| 
| Araneta Coliseum
| 2–2
|- bgcolor="#edbebf" 
| 5
| October 23
| Air21
| 95-110
| Espino (25)
| 
| 
| Araneta Coliseum
| 2–3
|- bgcolor="#edbebf" 
| 6
| October 28
| Red Bull
| 78-95
| White (16)
| 
| 
| Cuneta Astrodome
| 2–4
|- bgcolor="#edbebf" 
| 7
| October 30
| Brgy.Ginebra
| 89-96
| Weaver (28)
| 
| 
| Araneta Coliseum
| 2–5

|- bgcolor="#edbebf"
| 8
| November 4
| Purefoods
| 
| 
| 
| 
| Ynares Center
| 2–6
|- bgcolor="#bbffbb"
| 9
| November 9
| San Miguel
| 85-82
| Aquino (23)
| 
| 
| Araneta Coliseum
| 3–6
|- bgcolor="#bbffbb" 
| 10
| November 12
| Talk 'N Text
| 100-97
| Weaver (25)
| 
| 
| Zamboanga City
| 4–6
|- bgcolor="#bbffbb" 
| 11
| November 18
| San Miguel
| 85-80
| 
| 
| 
| Ynares Center
| 5–6
|- bgcolor="#edbebf" 
| 12
| November 20
| Air21
| 103-114
| Calimag (20)
| 
| 
| Cuneta Astrodome
| 5–7

|- bgcolor="#edbebf"
| 13
| December 7
| Alaska
| 82-87
| Owens (19)
| 
| 
| Ynares Center
| 5–8
|- bgcolor="#bbffbb" 
| 14
| December 9
| Red Bull
| 105-104 (2OT) 
| Owens (25)
| 
| 
| Cuneta Astrodome
| 6–8
|- bgcolor="#edbebf"
| 15
| December 14
| Purefoods
| 75-84
| Owens (22)
| 
| 
| Cuneta Astrodome
| 6–9
|- bgcolor="#bbffbb" 
| 16
| December 18
| Coca Cola
| 100-76
| Duremdes (28)
| 
| 
| Ynares Center
| 7–9

Transactions

Additions

References

Sta. Lucia Realtors seasons
Sta